Football is the most popular sport in Africa. Indeed, football is probably the most popular sport in every African country, although rugby and cricket are also very popular in South Africa.

History

Football was first introduced to Africa in the early 1860s by Europeans, due to the colonisation of Africa. The first recorded games were played in South Africa in 1862 between soldiers and civil servants and there were no established rules for the game at this time;" Initially, there were various forms of playing the game, which included elements of both rugby and soccer. It was not until October 26, 1863 that the "rules of association football were codified." The first official football organization in Africa, Pietermaritzburg County Football Association, was established in 1880.Teams were being established in South Africa before 1900, Egypt and in Algeria during a similar time period. Savages FC (Pietermaritzburg, South Africa), and Gezira SC are the oldest African football clubs that remain in existence. Both began play in 1882 followed by Alexandria SC (1890), CDJ Oran from Algeria in 1894 and CAL Oran from Algeria too in 1897. By the 1930s, football was being played in Central Africa. In 1882, the first national governing body on the content was formed, South African Football Association (SAFA). SAFA was a whites-only association that became the first member of FIFA in South Africa in 1910.As Africa is a highly superstitious continent many African teams depend on witch doctors for success. Activities that witch doctors have performed for teams include cutting players, placing potions on equipment, and sacrificing animals.

Children are also often exploited by agents in cases of football trafficking. Other issues faced in African football include a lack of organization by national team officials, and internal disputes between players and federation officials.
Football in Africa witnessed a great development in the last stage, which gained international fame, after the honor and representation of the honorable Congolese team TP Mazembe in the 2010 FIFA Club World Cup, the FIFA international tournament hosted by United Arab Emirates when TP Mazembe reached the final match against the Italian club Inter Milan. And Moroccan team Raja in the 2013 FIFA Club World Cup, the tournament hosted by Morocco when Raja reached the final match against the German club Bayern Munich.

In the 1990s, football in Africa experienced huge waves of change. One big change was the football migration to Europe. Many talented young players sought big careers in Europe and shot for their chance to make it big. Peter Alegi mentions the story of two in particular: Michael Essien who ended up making millions, and Albert Youmba who ended up failing. He states, “Penniless, homeless, and without a work permit, the young Cameroonian chose the life of an illegal immigrant rather than face potential embarrassment and shame if he went home.”. The hardships that Youmba faced versus the amount of success that Essien was met with showed the largely different experiences that a young African footballer would have to be prepared to face if they migrated.

Changes
The Confederation of African Football (CAF) was founded in 1957, Sudan was the founder of African football by creating CAF with four member nations: Egypt, Ethiopia, South Africa, and Sudan. The first Africa Cup of Nations was held the same year, with a three-team field. Egypt won the inaugural African Cup of Nations, defeating Ethiopia 4–0 in the final. As the sport grew football associations grew across the continent. Qualification rounds were added for the 1962 event. African national teams compete in the Africa Cup of Nations and also in the African Nations Championship for local teams.

The first African nation to participate in the FIFA World Cup was Egypt in 1934. That remained the only World Cup appearance by a team from the continent until 1966, when a team from CAF was originally scheduled to compete in a playoff with teams from Asia and Oceania for one tournament berth. In response, CAF nations boycotted World Cup qualifying, and FIFA granted CAF one guaranteed berth in the 1970 tournament. Starting in 1970, African nations at the FIFA World Cup started to compete regularly. Zaire was Africa's representative at the 1974 edition of the competition. The team lost all three of its games. In 1977, Pelé stated his belief that a team from the continent would be crowned World Cup champions by the end of the 20th century, which proved incorrect.

After the 1970, 1974, and 1978 World Cups, which each had one African qualifier, there were two teams from the continent in 1982: Algeria and Cameroon, each of which missed out on advancing from the group stage on goal difference. The 1986 and 1990 World Cups also featured two African nations; Morocco reached the round of 16 in 1986 after finishing first in their group. Cameroon advanced to the quarterfinals of the 1990 World Cup, becoming the first African national team to do so. Senegal and Ghana matched the feat, in 2002 and 2010 respectively. By 2010 South Africa become the first African nation to host the World Cup.

Women's football

In Africa, football was viewed as “hypermasculine” and the continent as a whole was not very supportive of women playing. Numerous Nigerian cities hosted women's football teams by 1960. Multiple efforts were made in the 1960s to start women's football clubs in South Africa, but they proved fleeting. The 1970s saw some growth, with new women's leagues in Nigeria and an expansion of women's football into Western African countries, including Senegal. One local club in Dakar played a match against an Italian club in 1974; five years later, an early match between African nations was played by the Dakar side and a team from Guinea. Until the 1990s, governments, businesses, and football associations dominated by men did not support women’s football in Africa.

Despite a lack of support from Nigerian officials, 28 clubs played women's football in the country by 1989, and Nigeria's national team competed in the 1991 Women's World Cup.The South African Women’s Football Association (SAWFA) was created around this time to govern women’s football, but it was not racially integrated for years to come. More women began playing football in the 1990s, in countries like Nigeria and South Africa. In 1998, CAF introduced an official African Women's Championship, following two unofficial versions of the tournament earlier in the 1990s; host country Nigeria won, beginning a stretch of five consecutive titles in the event. The next year, the squad reached the quarterfinals of the 1999 Women's World Cup.

Football is played in a limited capacity by women due to a lack of funding. The masculine nature of football has proved a deterrent to women's involvement in football in Africa.

See also

References

Sport in Africa
Association football in Africa